Die Muminfamilie (Literally: The Moomin Family) was a West German television series released from 1959 to 1960 that was based on the Moomin books by Tove Jansson. It was filmed in black and white and broadcast by ARD.  It was notably the first television series ever to be made based on the books. It was also the first TV-series produced by Augsburger Puppenkiste.  In all, 12 episodes were made.

Episodes
Season 1 (Die Muminfamilie) - 1959:
 Der geheimnisvolle Fund
 Die Verwandlung
 Der Urwald
 Der Ausflug
 Die Gäste
 Das große Fest

Season 2 (Sturm im Mumintal) - 1960:
 Sturm im Mumintal (sometimes seen as a different series from this point)
 Das Theater
 Emma
 Der Wald
 Die Generalprobe
 Zu Hause

Home release
The series was released as a part of a DVD box set containing other early children's television series produced in Germany  by Augsburger Puppenkiste.

References

External links
 Augsburger Puppenkiste
Die Muminfamilie/Sturm im Mumintal @ fernsehserien.de

1959 German television series debuts
1961 German television series endings
Moomin television series
German children's television series
Television shows based on children's books
1950s German television series
German television shows featuring puppetry
German-language television shows
Das Erste original programming